The 2018 European U23 Judo Championships were the edition of the European U23 Judo Championships, organised by the European Judo Union. It was held in Győr, Hungary from 2–4 November 2018.

Medal overview

Men

Women

Medal table

Participating nations
There was a total of 296 participants from 37 nations.

References

External links
 Results
 

European U23 Judo Championships
 U23
Judo, European Championships U23
European Championships U23
Judo, 2018 European Championships U23
Judo, 2018 European Championships U23
Judo, European Championships U23